Deandre' Eiland (born June 4, 1982) is a former American football player.

External links 
South Carolina Gamecocks bio

1982 births
Living people
Sportspeople from Tupelo, Mississippi
American football safeties
South Carolina Gamecocks football players
Amsterdam Admirals players